Ondřej Raab (born 20 June 1973 in Jablonec nad Nisou) is a Czech slalom canoeist who competed at the international level from 1990 to 2006.

He won two silver medals in the K1 team event at the European Championships.

Competing at the 2004 Summer Olympics in Athens in the K-1 event, he finished ninth in the qualification round, thus progressing to the semifinals. In the semifinals he finished fourteenth, failing to reach the top ten and the final round.

References

1973 births
Canoeists at the 2004 Summer Olympics
Czech male canoeists
Living people
Olympic canoeists of the Czech Republic
Sportspeople from Jablonec nad Nisou